Python On Song is the name of a double pack of two 7" singles  released by Monty Python on 19 November 1976. The first record was a straight reissue of the previous year's release of the "Lumberjack Song"/"Spam Song" single. The second record consisted of a live recording of "Bruces Song" taken from Live At Drury Lane, with the other side containing the group's second single "Eric The Half A Bee".

The two records were housed in a gatefold sleeve containing the lyrics for all four songs. The first 5000 copies had the Pythons' autographs printed on the cover and an adhesive seal holding the two sides of the gatefold together.

Track listing

Record One
Side One
Lumberjack Song
Side Two
Spam Song

Record Two
Side One
Bruces Song
Side Two
Eric The Half A Bee

References 

Monty Python songs
1976 singles
Charisma Records singles